Nuriddin Akhatovich Khamrokulov ((), born 25 October 1999) is a Tajikistani professional football player for FC Khatlon and the Tajikistan national team.

Career

International
Khamrokulov made his senior team debut on 24 May 2021 against Iraq, coming on as a 59th minute substitute for Parvizdzhon Umarbayev.

Career statistics

International

Statistics accurate as of match played 25 September 2022

Honors
Tajikistan
King's Cup: 2022

References

1999 births
Living people
Tajikistani footballers
Tajikistan international footballers
Association football forwards